C1-set domains are classical Ig-like domains resembling the antibody constant domain. C1-set domains are found almost exclusively in molecules involved in the immune system, such as in immunoglobulin light and heavy chains, in the major histocompatibility complex (MHC) class I and II complex molecules, and in various T-cell receptors.

Human proteins containing this domain 
AZGP1;     B2M;       CD1A;      CD1B;      CD1C;      CD1D;      CD1E;      DMA;
DQB2;      DRB1;      ELK2P1;    FCGRT;     HFE;       HHLA2;     HLA-A;     
HLA-B;     HLA-B35;   HLA-B57;   HLA-C;     HLA-CW;    HLA-Cw;    HLA-D;
HLA-DMA;   HLA-DMB;   HLA-DOA;   HLA-DOB;   HLA-DP;    HLA-DPA1;  HLA-DPB1;  HLA-DQA1;
HLA-DQA2;  HLA-DQB1;  HLA-DQB2;  HLA-DRA;   HLA-DRB1;  HLA-DRB2;  HLA-DRB3;  HLA-DRB4;
HLA-DRw12; HLA-Dw12;  HLA-E;     HLA-F;     HLA-G;     HLA-G2.2;  HLA-H;     HLAC;
IGHA1;     IGHA2;     IGHD;      IGHE;      IGHG1;     IGHG2;     IGHG3;     IGHG4;
IGHM;      IGHV4-31;  IGKC;      IGKV1-5;   IGKV2-24;  IGL@;      IGLC1;     IGLC3;
IGLL1;     IGLV2-14;  IGLV3-21;  IGLV3-25;  IGLV4-3;   MICA;      MICB;      MR1;
SIRPA;     SIRPB1;    SIRPG;     SNC73;     TAPBP;     TAPBPL;    TRBC1;     TRBV19;
TRBV21-1;  TRBV3-1;   TRBV5-4;   TRBV7-2;   micB;

References

Protein domains
Single-pass transmembrane proteins